Acacia delphina is a shrub belonging to the genus Acacia and the subgenus Phyllodineae. It is native to an area along the south coast in the Great Southern and Goldfields-Esperance regions of Western Australia.

It blooms from July to October and produces yellow flowers.

See also
List of Acacia species

References

delphina
Acacias of Western Australia
Taxa named by Bruce Maslin